Reuil is a former commune in the Marne department in north-eastern France. On 1 January 2023, it was merged into the new commune of Cœur-de-la-Vallée.

Population

See also
Communes of the Marne department
Montagne de Reims Regional Natural Park

References

Former communes of Marne (department)